Ahn Jae-hwan (June 8, 1972) was a South Korean actor.

Ahn was found dead in his car on August 22, 2008, but the exact time of his death has not been revealed; police confirmed that he had died several days prior as his body was already decaying. It is considered to be a case of suicide by carbon monoxide poisoning. He was 36 years old.

Filmography
The Record (2000)
 Show Show Show (2003)
Beautiful Temptation (2004)
Honest Living (2002)
Cha Ki-bum (2001)
Outing (2001)
Mother and Sisters	(2000)
She’s The One	(2000)
You’re One of A Kind	(1999)
Myth of a Hero 	(1997)
Medical Brothers (1997)
LA Arirang (1995)

References

External links
 
 Ahn Jae-hwan at HanCinema

1972 births
2008 deaths
People from Goesan County
South Korean male film actors
South Korean male television actors
20th-century South Korean male actors
21st-century South Korean male actors
Suicides by carbon monoxide poisoning in South Korea
2008 suicides